Distinguished Service Medal (DSM) is a high award of a nation.

Examples include:
Distinguished Service Medal (Australia) (established 1991), awarded to personnel of the Australian Defence Force for distinguished leadership in action
Distinguished Service Medal (India) (established 1907), awarded by the British Empire to Indian citizens serving in the Indian armed forces and police 
 Distinguished Service Medal (Ireland), a series of three decorations issued by the Irish Defence Forces
 Medal of Distinguished Service (Israel) (established 1970), awarded for exemplary bravery in the line of duty
 Distinguished Service Medal (Mexico), awarded to Army and Air Force personnel who demonstrate initiative and dedication throughout the course of their military career
 Coast Guard Auxiliary Distinguished Service Medal, Philippines (established 1972)
 Vishista Seva Vibhushanaya or Distinguished Service Decoration (Sri Lanka) (established 1981), awarded for exceptional, distinguished, and loyal service over a 25-year period
 State Medal of Distinguished Service (Turkey) (established 1983), for distinguished service in contribution to the Turkish State through generous action, self-sacrifice, accomplishment or merit
 Armed Forces Medal of Distinguished Service (Turkey) (established 1967), bestowed upon individuals whose contributions to the strengthening of the Turkish Armed Forces have been extraordinarily high
 Distinguished Service Medal (United Kingdom) (1914–1993), awarded to non-commissioned officers of the Royal Navy and other Commonwealth navies for bravery and resourcefulness on active service

United States
 Air Force Distinguished Service Medal (established 1960)
 Coast Guard Distinguished Service Medal (established 1949)
 Defense Distinguished Service Medal (established 1970)
 Distinguished Service Medal (U.S. Army) (established 1918)
 Homeland Security Distinguished Service Medal (established 2002)
 Lone Star Distinguished Service Medal, Texas
 Merchant Marine Distinguished Service Medal (established 1943)
 NASA Distinguished Service Medal (established 1959)
 National Intelligence Distinguished Service Medal (established 1993)
 Navy Distinguished Service Medal (established 1919; for both US Navy and US Marine Corps)
 Public Health Service Distinguished Service Medal
 Transportation Distinguished Service Medal (established 1992)
 Vermont Distinguished Service Medal (established 1999)

References

Medals

Former disambiguation pages converted to set index articles